Sang Ratu Sri Ugrasena was a Balinese king who is thought to have ruled between 837-864 Saka, or 915-942 CE. The capital of his kingdom was in Singhamandawa. The king issued several inscriptions regarding various activities of his people, including the giving of royal endowment, tax regulation, religious ceremony, and construction of public lodge and place of worship for pilgrims. His reign was approximately the same period as King Sindok's of the Isyana dynasty in East Java.

King Ugrasena is mentioned in at least 9 inscriptions, namely Sembiran A I inscription, Babahan I inscription, Srokadan A inscription, Pengotan A I inscription, Batunya A I inscription, Dausa A I and Dausa B I inscriptions, Serai A I inscription, and Goblek Pura Batur A inscription. All inscriptions are written in Old Balinese, begin with the words yumu pakatahu (let it be known), and end with the mention of the issuing body, namely the pangalapuan Singhamandawa (government advisory body in Singhamandawa).

King Ugrasena was buried in a temple called Air Madatu, according to the inscription issued by King Tabanendra Warmadewa who ruled afterward.

See also 
 Warmadewa dynasty
 List of monarchs of Bali

Footnotes

References 

 
 

 Monarchs of Bali
 History of Bali
10th-century Indonesian people